Quest Visual, Inc. was an American private company that developed Word Lens, an augmented reality translation application. In May 2014, the company was acquired by Google, Inc.

Company
Quest Visual was founded by a former video game developer Otavio Good in 2009. At the time of acquisition the company had 4 full-time employees (Good, John DeWeese, Bryan Lin, and Eric Park,) and a contractor, Maia Good. The details of the acquisition have not been released.

Products

Quest Visual's first product, Word Lens 1.0, was released on December 16, 2010, and was available in 2015 as Word Lens 2.2.3 for Apple's iPhone, iPod, and iPad through iTunes, as well as for a selection of Android smartphones through Google Play. It was unavailable as of 2021. At Google's unveiling of its Glass Development Kit in November 2013, translation capabilities of Word Lens were also demonstrated on Google Glass. According to a January 2014 New York Times article, Word Lens is currently free for Google Glass. Google also made all Word Lens language packs freely available for a "limited time". Word Lens capabilities were incorporated into the Google Translate app and released on January 14, 2015. The company did not have any other products by the time of acquisition.

See also
 Augmented reality
 Optical character recognition
 Google Translate

References

External links
 Quest Visual homepage
 Word Lens on iTunes
 Original video demonstration of Word Lens
 Otavio Good explains Word Lens 1.0.1 (interview with Reuters)

Companies based in San Francisco
Defunct software companies of the United States
Google acquisitions
2009 establishments in California
Software companies established in 2009
2015 disestablishments in California
Software companies disestablished in 2015
2015 mergers and acquisitions